Katrina Adams and Manon Bollegraf were the defending champions, but Adams did not compete this year. Bollegraf teamed up with Zina Garrison-Jackson and lost in the first round to Gigi Fernández and Natasha Zvereva.

Gigi Fernández and Natasha Zvereva won the title by defeating Gabriela Sabatini and Brenda Schultz 4–6, 6–4, 6–2 in the final.

Seeds

Draw

Draw

References

 Official results archive (ITF)
 Official results archive (WTA)

Advanta Championships of Philadelphia
1994 WTA Tour